Milliy Fırqa is a Crimean Tatar non-government organization. Its name is taken from the former party Milliy Fırqa which was banned by the Soviet authorities in 1921. The current leader is Vasvi Abduraimov.

In 2010, Abduraimov asked Crimean Tatars not to support any candidate in the 2010 Ukrainian presidential election.

Despite marginal support, Abduraimov and Milliy Fırqa were close to the government of Viktor Yanukovych, as well as to the Crimean government of Anatolii Mohyliov. Before the 2013 Crimean Tatar Remembrance Day of Victims of the Deportation, the Simferopol City Council first announced that they were going to ban the event. Later, Crimean authorities accepted a proposal from Milliy Fırqa, who would now be responsible for the event. However, in the face of protests from Crimean Tatar diaspora organizations from Europe, the United States and Turkey, Milliy Fırqa withdrew from the event on 10 May 2013, eight days before the event was scheduled to occur.

References

External links
Milliy Fırqa website

Ethnic organizations based in Ukraine
Crimean Tatar organizations
Politics of the Crimean Tatars